Georgios Spyridis (born 22 March 1959) is a sailor from Greece, who represented his country at the 1984 Summer Olympics in Los Angeles, United States as crew member in the Soling. With helmsman Anastasios Bountouris and fellow crew member Dimitrios Deligiannis they took the 6th place.

References

Living people
1959 births
Greek male sailors (sport)
Sailors at the 1984 Summer Olympics – Soling
Olympic sailors of Greece